Anders Grönlund (born 3 January 1989) is a professional Swedish Ice Hockey player. He currently plays for Frölunda HC in the Swedish Hockey League (SHL). His youth team was Öjeby IF.

References

External links

1989 births
Living people
Almtuna IS players
Asplöven HC players
IF Björklöven players
Frölunda HC players
Karlskrona HK players
Kristianstads IK players
Lillehammer IK players
Mora IK players
Swedish ice hockey goaltenders
IK Pantern players
People from Piteå
Rungsted Seier Capital players
Sportspeople from Norrbotten County